The Triton 24 sailing yacht is an inshore masthead sloop designed by John C Alsop and manufactured in Sydney, Australia, by the Triton Boat Company throughout the 1980s.

The Triton 24 sailing yacht is a fixed keel sailboat normally raced with a crew of three or four people although best enjoyed at a more leisurely pace with family and friends.  Because of its relatively wide beam and spacious cabin, the Triton 24 provides comfort and performance, both single handed or with competitive crew.

Keelboats